Eirik Bertheussen (born 2 April 1984 in Tromsø) is a Norwegian football defender who currently plays for FK Senja.

He has only played eight matches at Norway's top level, three for Tromsø in 2003 and five for Lillestrøm in 2006, 2007 and 2008. He did play several full seasons in the Adeccoligaen.

Career statistics

References

1984 births
Living people
Sportspeople from Tromsø
Norwegian footballers
Tromsdalen UIL players
Tromsø IL players
Lillestrøm SK players
Pors Grenland players
Norwegian First Division players
Eliteserien players

Association football defenders